Progreso is a port city in the Mexican state of Yucatán, located on the Gulf of Mexico in the north-west of the state some 30 minutes north of state capital Mérida (the biggest city on the Yucatán Peninsula) by highway. As of the Mexican census of 2010, Progreso had an official population of 37,369 inhabitants, the sixth largest community in the state in population. The city is also the municipal seat of the surrounding municipality of the same name. It includes Scorpion Reef with its five islets 130 km offshore (north) on the outer edge of Campeche Bank. Its largest other towns are Chicxulub Puerto, Campestre Flamboyanes, and Chelem.

Progreso is a center for both the fishing industry and the container industry. All containers arrive in Progreso and are distributed to Yucatán, Campeche and Quintana Roo.

Progreso also is one of the newest ports for large cruise ships and an emerging balneario resort destination. Passengers disembark on a very long pier, the Terminal Remota opened in 1989 that juts out  into the Gulf of Mexico.  Passengers are taken to shore to visit Progreso, Mérida or the Maya civilization archaeological sites of Uxmal and Dzibilchaltun.

During the months of July and August the beaches fill with thousands of mostly local tourists, as it is traditional in these months for residents of Mérida to leave the city and spend the summer in the cooler seaside environment.

History
Progreso was founded in 1872,  to create a sea port closer to Mérida than the older port of Sisal, Yucatán.

Climate
Despite its coastal location and fairly humid climate (average humidity around 70–80%), Progreso has a semi-arid climate (Köppen climate classification BSh). There is little variation in average temperatures though the winter months from December to March are noticeably more cool. Precipitation is scarce throughout the year but is more abundant from June to October. On average, there are 36 days with measureable rainfall.

Photo gallery

References

 Link to tables of population data from Census of 2010 INEGI: Instituto Nacional de Estadística, Geografía e Informática
Yucatán Enciclopedia de los Municipios de México

External links

Yucatán Enciclopedia de los Municipios de México

Populated places in Yucatán
Port cities and towns of the Mexican Gulf Coast
Ports of the Gulf of Mexico